Knef is a studio album by German actress and singer-songwriter Hildegard Knef, released in February 1970 on Teldec's Decca Records and Stern Musik, a music branding division of the magazine Stern. The singer considered it her best album.

Track listing

Personnel
Credits adapted from Knefs liner notes.

Hildegard Knef – primary artist, vocals
Hans Hammerschmid – arrangements, conducting
Hans Hammerschmid and his Orchestra – orchestra
The Rosy-Singers – choir
David Cameron Palastanga – producer
Martin Fouqué – engineer
Horst Angenendt – mastering
Rico Puhlmann – cover art
Ursula Marquardt – cover art

See also

1970 in music
Music of Germany
Baroque pop
Jazz pop

Notes

External links
 
  statistics, tagging and previews at Last.fm
  at Rate Your Music

1970 albums
German-language albums
Decca Records albums
Hildegard Knef albums